The Gemuuma River is a river of Espírito Santo state in eastern Brazil.

See also
List of rivers of Espírito Santo

References

Brazilian Ministry of Transport

Rivers of Espírito Santo